Urmas Ott (April 23, 1955 – October 17, 2008) was an Estonian television and radio journalist, and famous talk show host in Soviet Union, Estonia and Russia.

Ott was born in Otepää and first appeared on the Soviet Channel One in 1986 as host of Television Acquaintance show. He later worked on Russian Channel One and Estonian ETV, hosting "Urmas Ott and Others" on the latter channel.

Career
On television he interviewed well-known people, including Anatoly Karpov, Boris Spassky, Irina Rodnina, Ilya Glazunov, Chuck Norris and Alla Pugacheva. His style was intimate, usually facing the interviewee rather than the audience. He explained humorously that he appealed to Russian viewers because "I'm not one of them and I'm not foreign."

Personal life
He lived in Tallinn and died on 17 October 2008 in Tartu from a heart attack after a bone marrow transplantation undertaken to remedy leukemia.

Books
 Playback (1994)
 Carte Blanche (1995)
 Encore! Neeme Järvi (2001)
 Isikuraamat Erika Salumäest "Surplace" (2002)
 Isikuraamat Vardo Rumessenist "En face" (2002)
 Asmerid. Topeltpeeglis (2007)

References

External links
"Urmas Ott ja Teised" show on ETV

1955 births
2008 deaths
People from Otepää
Television talk show hosts
Estonian television personalities
Soviet television presenters
Estonian journalists
Recipients of the Order of the White Star, 4th Class
20th-century journalists